The 2017–18 Brunei Super League (also known as the DST Super League for sponsorship reasons) was the 5th season of the Brunei Super League, the top Bruneian professional league for association football clubs, since its establishment in 2012. The season began on 22 April 2017.

The Royal Brunei Armed Forces Sports Council came into the season as defending champions of the 2016 season. Menglait entered as the promoted team from the Premier League. No teams were relegated from last season. The winner received B$14,000 ($10,000 USD).

Teams
A total of 11 teams participated in the 2017 Super League season, ten from the previous season and one promoted team.

League table

See also
2017–18 Brunei FA Cup

References

External links
RSSSF
National Football Association of Brunei Darussalam website 

Brunei Super League seasons
Brunei